In probability and statistics, the logarithmic distribution (also known as the logarithmic series distribution or the log-series distribution) is a discrete probability distribution derived from the Maclaurin series expansion

 

From this we obtain the identity

This leads directly to the probability mass function of a Log(p)-distributed random variable:

for k ≥ 1, and where 0 < p < 1.  Because of the identity above, the distribution is properly normalized.

The cumulative distribution function is

where B is the incomplete beta function.

A Poisson compounded with Log(p)-distributed random variables has a negative binomial distribution.  In other words, if N is a random variable with a Poisson distribution, and Xi, i = 1, 2, 3, ... is an infinite sequence of independent identically distributed random variables each having a Log(p) distribution, then

has a negative binomial distribution.  In this way, the negative binomial distribution is seen to be a compound Poisson distribution.

R. A. Fisher described the logarithmic distribution in a paper that used it to model relative species abundance.

See also

 Poisson distribution (also derived from a Maclaurin series)

References

Further reading

Discrete distributions
Logarithms